Álvares Florence is a municipality in the state of São Paulo, Brazil. It has a population of 3,647 inhabitants (IBGE/2020) and an area of 362.9 km².

The city is located on the northwest of the state, 538 km from the city of São Paulo.
Álvares Florence belongs to the Microregion of Votuporanga.

History

At the end of the 19th century, Joaquim Pedro da Silva built the first residence on the region. With the time a village appeared, being named São João Batista do Marinheiro.

In 1926, the village was elevated to district of Tanabi, with the name of Vila Monteiro, and in November 30, 1944, the name changed to Igapira, being a district of the newly created city of Votuporanga.

The city was officially established as a municipality on December 24, 1948, changing its name to the current form. On April 10, 1949, the municipal chamber was installed.

Economy

The Tertiary sector corresponds to 43.88% of the Álvares Florence GDP. Agriculture and livestock is 29.45% of the GDP and the Industry corresponds to 26.67%.

Roads

SP-461 - Rodovia Péricles Bellini
SP-320 in Votuporanga

References

Municipalities in São Paulo (state)
Populated places established in 1948